Bogoliubov causality condition is a causality condition for scattering matrix (S-matrix) in axiomatic quantum field theory. The condition was introduced in axiomatic quantum field theory by Nikolay Bogolyubov in 1955.

Formulation
In axiomatic quantum theory, S-matrix is considered as a functional of a function  defined on the Minkowski space . For two points , the notation  means that  causally precedes .

The Bogoliubov causality condition in terms of variational derivatives has the form:

References 
N. N. Bogoliubov, A. A. Logunov, I. T. Todorov (1975): Introduction to Axiomatic Quantum Field Theory. Reading, Mass.: W. A. Benjamin, Advanced Book Program.
N. N. Bogoliubov, A. A. Logunov, A. I. Oksak, I. T. Todorov (1990): General Principles of Quantum Field Theory. Kluwer Academic Publishers, Dordrecht [Holland]; Boston. . .

Axiomatic quantum field theory